No More Heroes may refer to:

Music 

 No More Heroes (album), a 1977 album by The Stranglers
 "No More Heroes" (The Stranglers song), the title track
 "No More Heroes", a song by Westlife from the album Where We Are

Video games 
 No More Heroes (series), the video game series
 No More Heroes (video game), a 2007 video game for the Wii
 No More Heroes: Heroes' Paradise, a 2010 version of the game, for Xbox 360 and PlayStation 3
 No More Heroes Original Sound Tracks, a soundtrack album from the 2007 game
 Its 2010 sequel, No More Heroes 2: Desperate Struggle
 The 2019 game, Travis Strikes Again: No More Heroes
 The 2021 sequel, No More Heroes III